"Tick Tock" is a song by English electronic music group Clean Bandit and English singer Mabel, featuring American rapper 24kGoldn. It was written by Mabel, 24kGoldn, Kamille, Grace Chatto and Jack Patterson, the latter two of whom also produced the song with Mark Ralph. It was released by Atlantic Records UK on 21 August 2020 as the first single from Clean Bandit's upcoming third studio album. The song is also included as a bonus track on digital and streaming versions of Mabel's debut studio album, High Expectations.

Background
In a Zoom interview with ITN, the group revealed that they had started writing the song in November 2019, and that the song was finished just before the lockdown due to the COVID-19 pandemic. "It's been a mad process finishing it during this time," said Jack Patterson. "And even making the video when it was still lockdown situation, and working in that environment was quite crazy." He also praised both collaborators on the song, saying that they have been "so nice to work with and just made it super easy". Grace Chatto said that the group did not meet 24kGoldn in person, as he was in Los Angeles at the time, and they did everything remotely, including the filming of his part in the music video.

Chatto explained in another interview with the Daily Star that the song is about being "obsessed" with a guy. "We wrote it just before the pandemic and I was feeling a little obsessed with a guy – you know that annoying thing where you don't wanna be obsessed but you are? And if I find myself in that situation I do something I love and something which makes me feel satisfied in another way. In lockdown I enjoyed going for walks. I found being in nature makes you see the bigger picture again."

Whilst some have suggested that the song may be inspired by the video-sharing social networking service TikTok, Jack Patterson has denied this in an interview with the Metro, and reiterated that the song is about "an obsessive relationship".

Release
On 17 August 2020, Grace Chatto of Clean Bandit announced the song through a video posted on the group's social media pages. "Our new single is ready, it's called 'Tick Tock' and features Mabel and 24kGoldn, it's out this Friday," she said. "We are so excited for you to hear it!" The single's cover art was also revealed in the Instagram post. Mabel and 24kGoldn replied to the post with a smiling face with hearts emoji and "let's goooo", respectively. Mabel also posted a short video of her lip-syncing to the song on her social media pages.

An acoustic version of the song and an acoustic video was released on 4 September 2020.

Music video
Directed solely by Clean Bandit, the official video for "Tick Tock" premiered at 1 pm BST on 21 August 2020, after a 30-second trailer was released one day prior. It takes place at a house that resembles a cuckoo clock in the middle of a forest of glaciers. It also features a bathtub full of popcorn, as well as cardboard cities with running trains surrounding various music instruments, such as drums and digital pianos.

While the song is about obsessive relationships, the music video takes a slightly different direction. Jack Patterson said that they took a lighter approach and made the video about their own individual obsessions. "I have a Hornby model of a Eurostar train spinning around me. I love all types of transport," said Patterson.

Live performances
On 29 August 2020, Clean Bandit and Mabel performed the song live during the final of the fourth series of The Voice Kids UK.

Track listing
 Digital download and streaming
 "Tick Tock" (featuring 24kGoldn) – 2:58

 Digital download and streaming – Acoustic
 "Tick Tock" (Acoustic) – 3:08

 Digital download and streaming – Joel Corry Remix
 "Tick Tock" (featuring 24kGoldn) (Joel Corry Remix) – 2:39

 Digital download and streaming – Sam Feldt Remix
 "Tick Tock" (featuring 24kGoldn) (Sam Feldt Remix) – 2:34

 Digital download and streaming – UK Mix
 "Tick Tock" (featuring S1mba) (UK Mix) – 2:58

 Digital download and streaming – VIP Remix
 "Tick Tock" (featuring Beenie Man and Konshens) (VIP Remix) – 3:00

 Digital download and streaming – Topic remix
 "Tick Tock" (featuring 24kGoldn) (Topic remix) – 2:32

Personnel
Credits adapted from Tidal.

Original version
 Grace Chatto – production
 Jack Patterson – production
 Mark Ralph – production
 Mabel – vocals

Acoustic version
 Ashton Miranda – production
 Benjamin Totten – production
 Thomas Totten – production
 Mabel – vocals

Charts

Weekly charts

Year-end charts

Certifications

Release history

References

External links
 
 
 
 

2020 singles
2020 songs
Atlantic Records singles
Clean Bandit songs
Mabel (singer) songs
Electropop ballads
Pop ballads
Songs written by Kamille (musician)
Songs written by Grace Chatto
Songs written by Jack Patterson (Clean Bandit)
Songs written by Mabel (singer)
Song recordings produced by Mark Ralph (record producer)